Jason Scott Mesnick  is an American television personality, account executive, and realtor. He was the runner-up on season 4 of The Bachelorette and was featured on season 13 of The Bachelor.

Education
Mesnick graduated from Lake Washington High School in the Seattle suburb of Kirkland, Washington, and the University of Washington.

The Bachelorette/The Bachelor
Mesnick competed on  the fourth season of The Bachelorette, which premiered May 19, 2008, as one of the suitors of Deanna Pappas, even proposing in the final rose ceremony before Pappas stopped him. Mesnick was then chosen to be featured on the 13th season of The Bachelor, which premiered in January 2009.

On  The Bachelor, Mesnick proposed and became engaged to Melissa Rycroft. On the season's finale, Mesnick revealed that he changed his mind. When Rycroft was brought out, he broke up with her, and she returned the engagement ring. Molly Malaney, the runner-up, was then brought out. Mesnick asked for another chance with her, and she accepted.

Mesnick was a guest on Jimmy Kimmel Live! the day after the final episode, After the Final Rose, was aired. He said the chemistry was different between him and Rycroft. Kimmel asked Mesnick why he proposed marriage to Rycroft and Mesnick replied that Rycroft was exactly what he wanted at the time, but he did not want to lead Rycroft on. In June 2009 Rycroft announced her engagement to a man she had been dating in Dallas.

In October 2009, while vacationing in New Zealand, Mesnick asked Molly to marry him and she accepted.  They were married on February 27, 2010, in the Los Angeles suburb of Rancho Palos Verdes. Their wedding aired in a two-hour special called The Bachelor: Jason and Molly's Wedding, on March 8, 2010.

Personal life
Mesnick married Hilary Buckholz in 2003 and had a son in 2005. The couple divorced in 2007, and the couple shares custody of their son.

On October 12, 2012, Mesnick and his wife Molly announced they were expecting their first child together. Their daughter was born on March 14, 2013. The family resides in Kirkland, Washington.

Mesnick is a residential real estate agent.

References

External links

1976 births
Living people
Television personalities from Cleveland
People from Kirkland, Washington
University of Washington alumni
Bachelor Nation contestants